Walter George Parkinson (30 March 1892 – 11 September 1959) was an Australian rules footballer who played in the VFL between 1919 and 1921 for the Richmond Football Club.

References
Hogan P: The Tigers Of Old, Richmond FC, Melbourne 1996
 

1892 births
1959 deaths
Richmond Football Club players
Richmond Football Club Premiership players
Kyabram Football Club players
Australian rules footballers from Victoria (Australia)
One-time VFL/AFL Premiership players